Dr. Monazir Hassan (born 5 February 1957) is an Indian politician. He was the member of the Indian Parliament, in 15th Lok Sabha (2009 to 2014) and represented Begusarai (Lok Sabha constituency).
A trusted lieutenant of Nitish Kumar, Hassan had served as cabinet minister under Nitish before entering Lok Sabha. Hassan was part of Lalu Prasad Yadav’s RJD and served as minister under him too.

Early life and education 
Dr. Monazir Hassan (born 5 February 1957) in Munger district Munger, Bihar'''.

Dr. Hassan had his early education in Munger and has attended Tilka Manjhi Bhagalpur University.

Political career
1995 to 2009 Member Bihar Legislative Assembly (Four Terms) from Munger
1997 to 2004 State President. Rashtriya Janta Dal (Youth)
2000 to 2004 Minister of State Youth and Sports, Govt. of Bihar.
2005 to 2008 Cabinet Minister Building Construction, Govt. of Bihar. 
2009 to 2014 Member of Parliament from Begusarai Loksabha.

References

1957 births
Living people
India MPs 2009–2014
Lok Sabha members from Bihar
Janata Dal (United) politicians
Janata Dal politicians
Rashtriya Janata Dal politicians
Tilka Manjhi Bhagalpur University alumni